The 2023 FIVB Volleyball Men's Olympic Qualification Tournaments, alternatively the 2023 FIVB Volleyball Men's World Cup (for the tournament held in Japan) and also known as FIVB Road to Paris Volleyball Qualifier, are the three volleyball tournaments to be contested by 24 men's national teams of the  (FIVB), where the top teams will earn a place in the 2024 Summer Olympics volleyball tournament.

Hosts selection
On 16 October 2022, FIVB announced that Japan will host one of three tournaments for both men's and women's Olympic Qualification Tournaments (OQTs). The men's and women's OQTs held in Japan will traditionally known as World Cup in Japan. Later, on 8 March 2023, FIVB confirmed that Brazil and China will host the remaining two tournaments for men's OQTs. China will host the women's OQTs also.

Qualification

The FIVB Olympic Qualification Tournaments (OQTs) include the 24 best-placed non-qualified teams (except Russia who is ineligible to compete in the OQTs due to the 2022 Russian invasion of Ukraine) from the FIVB World Rankings as of 12 September 2022.

Pools composition
According to the qualification system, the twenty-four teams were placed into three pools of eight teams. For the first position of each pool, FIVB reserved the right to the three hosts with the top-ranked hosted team allocated to pool A, the middle-ranked hosted team allocated to pool B, and the last-ranked hosted team allocated to pool C. The remaining twenty-one teams were allocated into seven pots of three teams based on the FIVB Men's World Rankings of 1 January 2023. The order of drawing was applied with the serpentine system. The teams for the even-number position (Pot 1, Pot 3, Pot 5, Pot 7) were drawn and then placed starting from pool C to pool A. The teams for the odd-number position (Pot 2, Pot 4, Pot 6) were drawn and then placed starting from pool A to pool C.

The draw of lots ceremony will be held at the FIVB headquarter "Château Les Tourelles" in Lausanne, Switzerland, on 17 March 2023, 13:00 CET.

Draw

Notes
Teams in bold qualified for the 2024 Summer Olympics.
(): Qualification group hosts

Pool A (Brazil)
 All times are Brasília Time (UTC−03:00).
 The top two teams in this pool qualify for the 2024 Summer Olympics volleyball tournament.

Result

|}

|}

Final standing

Pool B (Japan)
 All times are Japan Standard Time (UTC+09:00).
 The top two teams in this pool qualify for the 2024 Summer Olympics volleyball tournament.
 The top team in this pool reigns over the 2023 FIVB Volleyball Men's World Cup.

Result

|}

|}

Final standing

Pool C (China)
 All times are China Standard Time (UTC+08:00).
 The top two teams in this pool qualify for the 2024 Summer Olympics volleyball tournament.

Result

|}

|}

Final standing

See also
2023 FIVB Volleyball Women's Olympic Qualification Tournaments

References

2023
2023
Volleyball Olympic Qualification
Volleyball Olympic Qualification
Volleyball Olympic Qualification
Volleyball qualification for the 2024 Summer Olympics
Volleyball
Volleyball
Volleyball
Olympic Qualification Tournaments Men
Olympic Qualification Tournaments Men
Olympic Qualification Tournaments Men
Olympic Qualification Tournaments Men
Olympic Qualification Tournaments Men
Olympic Qualification Tournaments Men
Olympic Qualification Tournaments Men
Olympic Qualification Tournaments